Genos Derwin "D. J." Williams, Jr. (born July 20, 1982) is a former American football linebacker who played 11 seasons in the National Football League (NFL). He played college football at the University of Miami and was drafted by the Denver Broncos in the first round of the 2004 NFL Draft. He also played for the Chicago Bears.

High school career
Williams, born and raised in Sacramento, California, lived with family in the Bay Area during high school. Williams did this in order to play high school football at Concord, California's De La Salle High School. He earned USA Today Defensive Player of the Year honors as a senior and was regarded as the top defensive player nationally. He compiled 130 tackles (87 solo) and rushed for 1,974 yards, six sacks, five  forced fumbles, three fumbles recoveries. On offense, he broke the school record for touchdowns in a season with 42 (33 rushing, five receiving, three punt return and one kickoff return).

College career

2000–2001
Williams started his collegiate career at the University of Miami at fullback due to a logjam at the linebacker position. Although he was used sparingly in his freshman year, he recorded 18 career rushes for 142 yards (7.9 avg.) with two touchdowns while catching 12 passes for 143 yards over his career.

2001–2002
Williams switched back to his favored linebacker position in 2001 and was quiet but productive member of the National Championship team. He compiled 51 tackles (25 solo), and one crucial forced fumble in the Rose Bowl against Nebraska.

2002–2003
In 2002, he was one of 11 semi-finalists for the Butkus Award along with teammate Jonathan Vilma, who was also a second-team All-BIG EAST selection. He registered 108 tackles (55 solos) to rank second on the team, notched four sacks, forced two fumbles, and broke up eight passes.

2003–2004
In his final year at Miami he blossomed into one of the best players in the country, finishing his senior year in 2003 as a semifinalist for the Butkus Award. He also a named third-team All-American by the Associated Press and a first-team All-Big East Conference choice. Williams finished second on the team with 82 tackles (44 solo) and tie for the team-lead with six sacks, forced a fumble and recovered another. His highlight of the season was a 61-yard run for a touchdown off a fake punt.

Professional career

NFL Draft
Williams was selected by the Denver Broncos in the first round (17th overall) of the 2004 NFL Draft. Williams emerged as one of the league's top linebackers.

Denver Broncos

2004–2005
In his rookie year, he started 14 of 16 games and led the Broncos with 114 tackles (82 solo). He also recorded two sacks, one interception and one forced fumble. Although an early candidate for Defensive Rookie of the Year, the award went to then-New York Jets linebacker Jonathan Vilma.

2005–2006
Williams was moved from his weak-side linebacker position to strong-side linebacker following the Broncos signing of Ian Gold. He finished with 55 tackles (39 solo) while adding three pass deflections and one forced fumble. Williams also contributed two tackles and a forced fumble on special teams.
He pleaded guilty in September 2005 to driving drunk and was ordered to perform 24 hours of community service.

2006–2007
In the 2006 season, he amassed 76 tackles (59 solo), a sack, one forced fumble, two pass deflections.

2007–2008
Following the injury-related release of Al Wilson, Williams was moved to his third position, middle linebacker.  He finished the 2007 season 2nd in the NFL with 141 tackles (106 solo) along with one sack and one interception.

2009–2010
2009 brought change to the Broncos defense when former Patriots offensive coordinator, Josh McDaniels was hired as head coach. McDaniels hired former 49ers head coach and defensive guru Mike Nolan as defensive coordinator. Nolan installed the 3-4 defense, in which he moved D.J. Williams to inside linebacker (ILB). Playing the "Jack" ILB position (same as Patrick Willis - 49ers), Williams finished the season with 122 tackles, 3.5 sacks and 3 forced fumbles.

On November 12, 2010, Williams was pulled over by a Police officer for driving without headlights on. He was cited for DUI, a misdemeanor and driving without headlights. As this was his second DUI charge, Williams faced a mandatory 10-day jail sentence and a minimum of two years probation if he was convicted - he was ordered to appear in court on December 13.

As a result of the arrest, the Denver Broncos fined Williams and demoted him from Defensive Co-Captain. It was also announced that he would not start the Week 10 match-up against AFC West rivals the Kansas City Chiefs.

By the end of the season, Williams finished with 119 tackles (94 solo), 5.5 sacks, 9 pass deflection and 1 forced fumble.

2012
In March 2012, Williams was suspended for six games after failing a mandatory league drug test. Wesley Woodyard replaced Williams at linebacker. Williams' suspension was extended by three games by the NFL.

Williams was released by the Broncos on March 11, 2013.

Chicago Bears

2013
On March 22, 2013 the Chicago Bears signed Williams to a one-year contract. In week six against the New York Giants, Williams ruptured his pectoral tendon. He was placed on injured reserve on October 18. Williams was a free agent after 2013, but re-signed with the Bears to a one-year deal on March 11, 2014.

NFL statistics

Key
 GP: games played
 COMB: combined tackles
 TOTAL: total tackles
 AST: assisted tackles
 SACK: sacks
 FF: forced fumbles
 FR: fumble recoveries
 FR YDS: fumble return yards 
 INT: interceptions
 IR YDS: interception return yards
 AVG IR: average interception return
 LNG: longest interception return
 TD: interceptions returned for touchdown
 PD: passes defensed

References

External links
Chicago Bears bio
Official website

1982 births
Living people
American football linebackers
American sportspeople in doping cases
Chicago Bears players
Denver Broncos players
Doping cases in American football
Miami Hurricanes football players
Sportspeople from the San Francisco Bay Area
De La Salle High School (Concord, California) alumni